Benjamin Kiyini Nduga (born 1930) is a Ugandan sprinter. He competed in the men's 100 metres and men's 200 metres at the 1956 Summer Olympics.

References

External links
 

1930 births
Possibly living people
Athletes (track and field) at the 1956 Summer Olympics
Ugandan male sprinters
Olympic athletes of Uganda
Athletes (track and field) at the 1954 British Empire and Commonwealth Games
Athletes (track and field) at the 1958 British Empire and Commonwealth Games
Commonwealth Games competitors for Uganda
Place of birth missing (living people)